Kicking King is a National Hunt racehorse trained in Straffan, Co. Kildare, Ireland, by Tom Taaffe. He is best known for his victory in the 2005 Cheltenham Gold Cup, the major Chase run at the Cheltenham Festival. He also won the King George VI Chase in 2004 and 2005: once at Kempton and once at Sandown Park, when the race was relocated due to the development of an all-weather track at Kempton.  His Boxing Day win on Sunday 26 December was a first; when See More Business won the race in 1999, Christmas Sunday was still observed, so that year the race was first-scheduled for the Monday.  Thus he was the first horse to win twice on non-weekdays.  He was second twice in previous Cheltenham Festivals, in the 2003 Supreme Novices' Hurdle, and in the 2004 Arkle Challenge Trophy.

After suffering a tendon injury in the 2005 King George VI Chase, he was withdrawn from competition for the rest of the hunt season. He was due to make a comeback in the 2006–07 season, but on further inspection of his injury it was decided to keep the horse off the track for the rest of the season.  However, he returned in January 2008, finishing a close second to Nickname in the Normans Grove Chase. He was subsequently sent off favourite for the Red Mills Chase in February and finished third. Kicking King went on to contest the Punchestown Gold Cup but was pulled up.

He reappeared for the 2008/09 season in the Grade 2 Gowran Park Champion Chase and fell in the race eventually won by Knight Legend. He made another appearance in a chase at Punchestown, where he was 2nd of 4 runners behind War Of Attrition. It was his last race, as he was retired in November 2008. Kicking King is now enjoying his retirement in the lush green paddocks of the Irish National Stud in County Kildare and enjoys meeting the thousands of admirers who visit him there each year.

Since his successful debut in a National Hunt flat race, Kicking King has amassed more than £800,000 in prize money and has six Grade One wins to his name.

Pedigree

Kicking King is 4x4 inbred to Darius II

References

External links
 Career 1-2-3 Colour Chart – Kicking King

1998 racehorse births
Cheltenham Gold Cup winners
Cheltenham Festival winners
National Hunt racehorses
Racehorses bred in Ireland
Racehorses trained in Ireland
Thoroughbred family 8-c